The FA Women's League Cup is a league cup competition in English women's association football. The competition was originally open to the eight teams in the FA WSL, but since the WSL's restructuring to two divisions, it has featured 23 teams. Prior to this it was known as the FA WSL Cup.
The sponsor Continental AG was announced on 19 August 2011, meaning that for sponsorship reasons the competition is referred to as the FA Women's Continental Tyres League Cup.

Twelve editions have been played, with Arsenal winning six finals.

History

Before the creation of the FA Women's Super League the top women's clubs competed in the FA Women's Premier League Cup.

The first League Cup edition under the WSL was played after the inaugural FA WSL season. Arsenal, having already won the WSL and the FA Women's Cup, completed the national treble after a 4–1 win over Birmingham City.

The 2012 cup saw a change of format. The straight knock-out was abolished and group-stage with two groups was created. The top two of each group advance to the semi-finals.

2014 saw 18 teams enter, with the new WSL 2 teams joining the WSL teams. There are three groups of six teams. In 2015 for the first time a quarter-final stage was played.

For 2016 the cup changed to a true knock-out format and abolished the group stage. A move which was made in agreement with the clubs to increase excitement and competitiveness. With 19 teams, the bottom six teams play a preliminary round. The round of 16 following that is seeded, so that WSL 1 teams meet WSL 2 teams, who have home advantage.

In 2017–18 again a group stage was added.

In 2018–19, as part of the restructuring of women's football, 22 teams entered. The competition was split up into 11 North and South, with each region having one group of six and one group of five. Each team would play one match against each other, with the top two in each group advancing to a quarter-final.

The format was similar in 2019–20, with an extra team in the South. The groups are A (North, 6 teams) B (South, 6 teams) C (North, 5 teams) D (South, 6 teams) making 23 teams.

List of finals
Only Arsenal, Chelsea and Manchester City have won the FA Women's League Cup. Birmingham City have lost the most finals, finishing as runners-up three times.

Results by team
Teams shown in italics are no longer in existence.

References

External links
Cup at fawsl.com

 
Women's football competitions in England
Recurring sporting events established in 2011
National association football league cups
2011 establishments in England